Pey Alvar (also spelt Peyalvar, Peialvar, Pey Azhwar, or Pei Azhwar) is one of the twelve Alvar saints of South India, who are known for their affiliation to Vaishnava tradition of Hinduism. The verses of Alvars are compiled as Nalayira Divya Prabandham and the 108 temples revered are classified as Divya Desams. Pey Alvar is considered third in the list of the three principal Alvars, with the other two being Poigai Alvar and Bhoothath Alvar, collectively called Mutalamalvargal who are known to be born out of divinity. Pey Alvar composed hundred verses that are classified as Munram Tiruvantati and his composition is set in the antati style in which the ending syllable is the starting one for the next verse.

As per Hindu legend, Pey Alvar was found in the lily flower in the pond of the Adi Kesava Perumal Temple in Mylapore. The site can be found in Arundale Street, Mylapore, Chennai. In Tamil, pey refers to one who is possessed and since the saint was madly attracted to Hindu god Vishnu, he got the name.

As per legend, the three Alvars were once were confined in a small dark enclosure during a rain in Thirukovilur and they experienced a fourth individual among them. They found out that it was god Vishnu and Poigai Alvar wished to see his face continuously but could view only from the simmering light of the lightning. With a view to maintain the continuity of light, Poigai instantly composed hundred songs wishing light to emerge. Pey Alvar and Bhoothath Alvar continued composing hundred songs each on Vishnu.
The works of these earliest saints contributed to the philosophical and theological ideas of Vaishnavism. Along with the three Saiva Nayanmars, their works influenced the ruling Pallava kings of the South Indian region, resulting in changing the religious geography from Buddhism and Jainism to the two sects of Hinduism.

Alvars
The word alvar means the one who dives deep into the ocean of the countless attributes of god. Alvars are considered the twelve supreme devotees of Vishnu, who were instrumental in popularising Vaishnavism during the 5th-8th centuries CE. The religious works of these saints in Tamil, songs of love and devotion, are compiled as Nalayira Divya Prabandham containing 4000 verses and the 108 temples revered in their songs are classified as Divya desam. The saints had different origins and belonged to different castes. As per tradition, the first three Alvars, Poigai, Bhutha and Pey were born miraculously. Tirumalisai was the son of a sage, Thondaradi, Mathurakavi, Periyalvar and Andal were from the Brahmin community, Kulasekhara from Kshatria community, Nammalvar was from a cultivator family, Tirupanalvar from panar community and Tirumangaiyalvar from kallar community. Divya Suri Saritra by Garuda-Vahana Pandita (11th century CE), Guruparamparaprabavam by Pinbaragiya Perumal Jiyar, Periya tiru mudi adaivu by Anbillai Kandadiappan, Yatindra Pranava Prabavam by Pillai Lokam Jiyar, commentaries on Divya Prabandam, Guru Parampara (lineage of Gurus) texts, temple records and inscriptions give a detailed account of the Alvars and their works. According to these texts, the saints were considered incarnations of some form of Vishnu. Poigai is considered an incarnation of Panchajanya (Krishna's conch), Bhoothath of Kaumodakee (Vishnu's Mace/Club), Pey of Nandaka (Vishnu's sword), Thirumalisai of	Sudarshanam (Vishnu's discus), Nammalvar of Vishvaksena (Vishnu's commander), Madhurakavi of Vainatheya (Vishnu's snake, Seshanaga), Kulasekhara of	Kaustubha (Vishnu's necklace), Periy of Garuda (Vishnu's eagle), Andal of Bhoodevi (Vishnu's wife, Lakshmi, in her form as Bhudevi), Thondaradippodi of Vanamaalai (Vishnu's garland), Thiruppaanalvar of Srivatsa (An auspicious mark on Vishnu's chest) and Thirumangaiyalvar of Saranga (Rama's bow). The songs of Prabandam are regularly sung in all the Vishnu temples of South India daily and also during festivals.

According to traditional account by Manavala Mamunigal, the first three Alvars namely Poigai, Bhoothath and Pey Alvar belong to Dvapara Yuga (before 4200 BCE), as per the details, all Alvars lived around 4300 BCE–900 CE. Some modern scholars suggest that they lived during 5th–8th century, although such estimates lack evidence. But it is widely accepted by tradition and historians that the trio are the earliest among the twelve Alvars. Along with the three Saiva nayanmars, they influenced the ruling Pallava kings, creating a Bhakti movement that resulted in changing the religious geography from Buddhism and Jainism to these two sects of Hinduism in the region. The Alvars were also instrumental in promoting the Bhagavatha cult and the two epics of India, namely, Ramayana and Mahabaratha. The Alvars were instrumental in spreading Vaishnavism throughout the region. The verses of the various Alvars were compiled by Nathamuni (824-924 CE), a 10th-century Vaishnavite theologian, who called it the "Tamil Veda".

Early life
In Tamil, pey refers to one who is possessed and since the saint was madly attracted to Hindu god Vishnu, he got the name. As per Hindu legend, Pey Alvar was found in the lily flower in the pond of the Adi Kesava Perumal Temple in Mylapore (historically called Manikaivaram), a suburb in Chennai. He is also called Mahadahvaya and Mylapuradapadhi.

Composition
As per Hindu legend, Vishnu appeared to the mutalam Alvars (first three Alvars) at Thirukkoilur. It was day time, but it darkened and started raining heavily. The wandering Poigai found out a small hide out, which has a space for one person to lie down. Boodath arrived there looking for a hiding place and Poigai accommodated him, with both sitting together. In the meanwhile, Pey Alvar also came to the same place as all the three preferred to stand because of lack of space. The darkness became dense and inside the small room, they were not able to see each other. In the meanwhile, they felt a fourth person also forced his way among them. The three Alvars realised from the light of the lightning that the fourth one had a charming face that was sublime and divine. The trio could immediately realize that it was Vishnu who was huddling among them. Poigai wished to see Vishnu's face continuously but could view only from the simmering light of the lightning. With a view to maintain the continuity of light, he instantly composed hundred songs wishing the earth to be a big pot full of ghee like an ocean where the Sun could be the burning wick.

Tamil
திருக்கண்டேன் பொன்  மேனி  கண்டேன்  திகழும் 
அருக்கனணி  நிறமும்  கண்டேன்   - செருக்கிளரும் 
பொன்னாழி  கண்டேன்  புரி  சங்கம்  கைக்கண்டேன் 
என்னாழி  வண்ணன்  பால்  இன்று   

Transliteration
Tiruk Kanden Pon Meni Kanden- Thigazhum 
Arukkan Ani Niramum Kanden-Seruk Kilarum 
Pon Aazhi Kanden Puri Sangam Kai Kanden 
En Aazhi Vannan Paal Inru 

Bhoothath Alvar also sang 100 songs imagining to light the lamp constantly through ardent love for Him. Pey Alvar sang another 100 songs where he described the enchanting charm of the divine face and the association of Narayana equipped with chakra and sankha, and his divine consort goddess Lakshmi.

Pey Alvar composed hundred verses that are classified as Munram Tiruvantati. Pey Alvar's composition was set in the antati style. The word Andha means end and Adi means beginning. antati style has ending word or the syllable of each verse as the beginning word of the succeeding verse and the last word of the hundredth verse becomes the beginning of the first verse, making the hundred verses a true garland of verses. The works of these earliest saints contributed to the philosophical and theological ideas of Vaishnavism. The verses of the trio speak of Narayana (another name for Vishnu) as the supreme deity and they refer frequently to Trivikrama and Krishna, the avatars of Vishnu.

Mangalasasanam
There are 39 of his paasurams in the 4000 Divya Prabhandham. He has sung in praise of fourteen temples.

References

Sources
 
 
 

Alvars
Sri Vaishnava religious leaders
Bhakti movement
Vaishnava saints
Tamil Hindu saints

te:ముదలాళ్వారులు